Top-seeded Li Na won the first edition of this tournament, defeating Klára Zakopalová in the final, 6–3, 1–6, 7–5.

Seeds

Draw

Finals

Top half

Bottom half

Qualifying

Seeds

Qualifiers

Lucky losers
  Zhou Yimiao

Draw

First qualifier

Second qualifier

Third qualifier

Fourth qualifier

External links
 Main draw
 Qualifying draw

WTA Shenzhen Open
2013 Singles